Ondřej Kopřiva (born 24 May 1988) is a Czech badminton player. Together with his brother, Tomáš Kopřiva, they won the 2009 Slovak Open, and finished runner-up in the 2008 Slovenian International. The duo then participated at the 2010 BWF World Championships. He also partnered with Pavel Florián, and won the 2015 Uganda International.

Achievements

BWF International Challenge/Series 
Men's doubles

  BWF International Challenge tournament
  BWF International Series tournament
  BWF Future Series tournament

References

External links 
 

1988 births
Living people
Sportspeople from Hradec Králové
Czech male badminton players
Badminton players at the 2015 European Games
European Games competitors for the Czech Republic